The government of the Marshall Islands is the largest employer, employing 30.6% of the work force, down by 3.4% since 1988. GDP is derived mainly from payments made by the United States under the terms of the amended Compact of Free Association. Direct U.S. aid accounted for 60% of the Marshall Islands' $90 million budget. The economy combines a small subsistence sector and a modern urban sector.

Subsistence economy 

The subsistence economy consists of fishing and breadfruit, banana, taro, and pandanus cultivation. On the outer islands, production of copra and handicrafts provide cash income. The modern service-oriented economy is located in Majuro and Ebeye. It is sustained by government expenditures and the U.S. Army installation at Kwajalein Atoll. The airfield there also serves as a second national hub for international flights.

Modern economy 

The modern sector consists of wholesale and retail trade; restaurants; banking and insurance; offshore companies registration; construction, repair, and professional services; and copra processing. Company formation in the Marshall Islands is available for residents and non-residents. Non-residents enjoy privacy benefits and zero local taxes. Copra cake and oil are by far the nation's largest exports. A tuna processing plant employs 300 workers, mostly women, at $1.50 per hour. Copra production, the most important single commercial activity for the past 100 years, now depends on government subsidies. The subsidies, more a social policy than an economic strategy, help reduce migration from outer atolls to densely populated Majuro and Ebeye.

Marine resources, including fishing, aquaculture, tourism development, and agriculture, are top government development priorities. The Marshall Islands sells fishing rights to other nations as a source of income. In recent years, the Marshall Islands has begun to offer ship registrations under the Marshall Islands flag. As a small nation, the Marshall Islands must import a wide variety of goods, including foodstuffs, consumer goods, machinery, and petroleum products.

Coconut oil
Power authorities, private companies, and entrepreneurs are experimenting with coconut oil as an alternative to diesel fuel for vehicles, power generators, and ships. Coconut trees abound in the Pacific's tropical islands. One liter of oil can be produced from the copra of 6–10 coconuts.

Digital currency
In February 2018, the Marshallese government enacted the Sovereign Currency Act of 2018 to develop a national digital currency, the Marshallese Sovereign (SOV), that would reduce the country's dependence on the U.S. dollar. The SOV plan prompted a vote of no confidence in President Hilda Heine, who was in favour of the scheme, in November 2018, which failed when parliament deadlocked on the question.

The SOV is intended to serve as a second legal tender for the Marshall Islands, alongside the U.S. dollar; however, the International Monetary Fund has stated that it does not meet the definition of a central bank digital currency. The IMF also raised concerns about macroeconomic and financial integrity risks associated with the digital currency. Despite the objections of the IMF, the U.S. Treasury Department, and banks, the Marshallese government has continued to work toward the development of the SOV. The country is using Algorand open-source blockchain technology for the SOV ledger.

Gross domestic product 

GDP:
purchasing power parity - $150 million (2011 est.)

GDP - real growth rate:
3% (2011 est.)

GDP - per capita:
purchasing power parity - $2 500 (2011 est.)

GDP - composition by sector:
agriculture:
22%
industry:
18%
services:
60% (2008)

The islands have few natural resources, and their imports far exceed exports. According to the CIA, the value of exports in 2013 was approximately $53.7 million while estimated imports were $133.7 million. Agricultural products include coconuts, tomatoes, melons, taro, breadfruit, fruits, pigs and chickens. Industry is made up of the production of copra and craft items, tuna processing and tourism. The CIA estimates that the GDP in 2016 was an estimated $180 million, with a real growth rate of 1.7% while the GDP per capita was $3,300.

Marshall Island productivity 

Population below poverty line:
NA%

Household income or consumption by percentage share:
lowest 10%:
NA%
highest 10%:
NA%

Inflation rate (consumer prices):
5% (2007)

Labor force:
NA

Labor force - by occupation:
agriculture 48%, industry 12%, services 40% (2008)

Unemployment rate:
8% (2011 est.)

Budget:
revenues:
$169.5 million
expenditures:
$112.1 million, including capital expenditures of $19.5 million (FY08/09 est.)

Industries:
copra, fish, tourism, craft items from shell, wood, and pearls, offshore banking (embryonic)

Industrial production growth rate:
NA%

Electricity - production:
114 GWh (2008)

Electricity - production by source:
fossil fuel:
NA%
hydro:
NA%
nuclear:
NA%
other:
NA%

Electricity - consumption:
57 GWh (1994)

Electricity - exports:
0 kWh (1994)

Electricity - imports:
0 kWh (1994)

Agriculture - products:
coconuts, cacao, taro, breadfruit, fruits; pigs, chickens

Exports:
$132 million (f.o.b., 2008 est.)

Exports - commodities:
fish, coconut oil, trochus shells

Exports - partners:
United States, Japan, Australia, New Zealand

Imports:
$125 million (f.o.b., 2008 est.)

Imports - commodities:
foodstuffs, machinery and equipment, fuels, beverages and tobacco

Imports - partners:
United States, Japan, Australia, New Zealand, Guam, Singapore

Debt - external:
$68 million (2008 est.)

Economic aid - recipient:
approximately $40 million annually from the US

Currency:
1 United States dollar (US$) = 100 cents

Exchange rates:
US currency is used

Fiscal year:
1 October - 30 September

See also
Ministry of Finance (Marshall Islands)
Marshall Islands

References